Yei Zhuang is a Northern Tai language complex spoken in Wenshan Prefecture, Yunnan, China. Its speakers are also known as the Sha (沙族), a subgroup of the Zhuang.

Distribution
In Yunnan, Yei Zhuang dialects are spoken in Funing and Guangnan counties (also in Guangxi to the east and north), as well as Qiubei (probably also in Qujing Municipality to the north). The largest concentrations of Yei Zhuang speakers are found in Qiubei (80% of total Zhuang population) and Funing (50% of total Zhuang population) counties (Johnson 2011a:43).

Po-ai, a Tai language of Funing County described by Fang-kuei Li in the mid-1900s, was determined by Johnson (2011b) to be a Yei Zhuang dialect.

Names
Below are various names (both autonyms and exonyms) for speakers of Yei Zhuang (Johnson 2011a:43).

pu Nong (濮侬)
 (Qiubei)
bu Yai (布雅衣)
bu Yei (布依, 布瑞, 布越)
Shazu (沙族) or Sharen (沙人)
Baisha (白沙)
Nongqianbeng (侬迁绷)
Zhongjia (仲家)

Many of these are names of Bouyei as well.

Characteristics
There are no palatalized consonants in Qiubei Zhuang. /pj/ in standard Zhuang is /p/, as in /pja1/ "fish", pjak7 "vegetable" is /pa/1, /pak/7. /mj/ is m or n，for example mjaːk3 "slippery", mjaːi2 "saliva" as /ma6/, /naːi2/. /kj/ is merged into k or t，for example kjaːŋ1 "middle", kja4(orphan) is /kaːŋ3/, /tsa4/. The consonant k before i, e is changed to ts, for instance ki3 "several", kiːŋ2 (triangular cooker), ke5 "old" as /tʃi1/, /tʃiːŋ2/, /tʃes/.

References

 Johnson, Eric C. 2011a. "The Southern Zhuang Languages of Yunnan Province's Wenshan Prefecture from a Sociolinguistic Perspective." [Working paper]. S.l.: s.n. 49 pages.
 Johnson, Eric C. 2011b. "A Lexical and Phonological Comparison of the Central Taic Languages of Wenshan Prefecture, China: Getting More Out of Language Survey Wordlists Than Just Lexical Similarity Percentages." SIL Electronic Working Papers 2011-005: 170.

Tai languages